The Fun Tour was a concert tour by American recording artist Cyndi Lauper in support of her debut album She's So Unusual. It was her first major headlining tour, with over 90 dates in various cities across North America. The tour kicked off in Poughkeepsie, New York, on November 22, 1983, and ended in St. Paul, Minnesota, on December 9, 1984. Lauper also performed shows in Paris, London and Switzerland.

The performance at the Summit in Houston in October 1984 was filmed for a planned home video release in 1985 which fell through; however, the promotional video for "Money Changes Everything" was taken from this footage.  The show was also broadcast locally over the radio that evening.  The show at The Palace in Hollywood in February 1984 was filmed and, along with performances by Madness and Ultravox, aired as a show called Rock of the 80s on Showtime. The New Year's Eve 1983 performance at the Ritz aired on MTV that evening as a New Year's Eve special.

Set list
"When You Were Mine"
"I'll Kiss You"
"I Had a Love"
"Goonies 'R' Good Enough"
"All Through the Night"
"Time After Time"
"Right Track Wrong Train"
"He's So Unusual"
"Yeah Yeah"
"Witness"
"I’m Gonna Be Strong"
"Girls Just Want to Have Fun"
"What A Thrill"
"She Bop"
"Money Changes Everything"
"Maybe He’ll Know"

Tour dates

Box office score data

The Band
 Kenni Hairston – Keyboard & Vocals
 Sandy Gennaro – Drums
 John K. – Bass
 John McCurry – Guitar & Vocals

References

External links
 Cyndi Lauper's Official Website

1983 concert tours
Cyndi Lauper concert tours